Tyrell Davis (1902–1970) was a British film actor, Cambridge educated, who appeared on the West End and Broadway stage, as well as in British and American films.

Filmography

 Lucky in Love (1929)
 Mother's Boy (1929)
 His Glorious Night (1929)
 Strictly Unconventional (1930)
 Love in the Rough (1930)
 Let Us Be Gay (1930)
 Rain or Shine (1930)
 Prince of Diamonds (1930)
 The Dancers (1930)
 Paid (1930)
 The Magnificent Lie (1931)
 Parlor, Bedroom and Bath (1931)
 The Road to Singapore (1931)
 The Phantom of Paris (1931)
 God's Gift to Women (1931)
 Chances (1931)
 Murder at Midnight (1931)
 Temptation's Workshop (1932)
 The Unexpected Father (1932)
 Lady with a Past (1932)
 Lovers Courageous (1932)
 Call Her Savage (1932)
 Love in High Gear (1932)
 Our Betters (1933)
 Blind Adventure (1933)
 Pleasure Cruise (1933)
 Peg o' My Heart (1933)
 Dangerously Yours (1933)
 Designing Women (1934)
 Freedom of the Seas (1934)
 Smith's Wives (1935)
 All at Sea (1935)
 Under Proof (1936)
 Parisian Life (1936)
 Dinner at the Ritz (1937)
 The Green Cockatoo (1937)
 Strange Boarders (1938)
 Second Best Bed (1938)

References

External links
 
 

1902 births
1970 deaths
English male stage actors
English male film actors
People from Surbiton
Male actors from Surrey
20th-century English male actors
Alumni of the University of Cambridge